Sheraton Grand Incheon Hotel is the first hotel to open in Songdo IBD.  Hotel is  adjacent to the Northeast Asia Trade Tower, Songdo Convensia, and Songdo Central Park.

It is a five-star rated hotel managed by Marriott International, and it is a LEED Certified hotel designed by HOK.  Sustainable strategy includes two, four story tall perforated aluminum sunshades that can minimize the exposure to direct solar gain.  Hotel provides 319 rooms, nine banquet halls, free internet lounge, fitness center, indoor swimming pool.

References

External links
 
 Sheraton Grand Incheon Hotel Facebook

Buildings and structures in Incheon
Hotels in South Korea
Sheraton hotels
Songdo International Business District
Hotel buildings completed in 2009
HOK (firm) buildings